The Houston Texans are a professional American football team from Houston,  playing in the National Football League (NFL). They joined the NFL in 2002 as an expansion franchise. Following the controversial relocation of the Houston Oilers to Nashville and the NFL's need for a 32nd team in the league, Houston was awarded the upcoming franchise, at a cost of $700 million paid by then-owner Bob McNair. The Houston Texans made their first selection as an NFL team in the 2002 NFL draft, selecting  Fresno State quarterback David Carr number 1 overall. The team's most recent first-round selection was Tytus Howard, an offensive tackle from Alabama State, selected in 2019.

Every year during April, each NFL franchise seeks to add new players to its roster through a collegiate draft known as the "NFL Annual Player Selection Meeting," which is more commonly known as the NFL Draft. Teams are ranked in inverse order based on the previous season's record, with the team with the worst record picking first, and the second worst picking second and so on. The two exceptions to this order are made for teams that appeared in the previous Super Bowl; the Super Bowl champion always picks 32nd, with the loser of the big game always picking 31st.  Teams have the option of trading away their picks to other teams for different picks, players, cash, or a combination thereof.  Thus, it is not uncommon for a team's actual draft pick to differ from their assigned draft pick, or for a team to have extra or no draft picks in any round due to these trades.

The Texans have selected number one overall three times, David Carr in 2002, Mario Williams in 2006, and Jadeveon Clowney in 2014. No player ever drafted by the Texans has been enshrined in the Pro Football Hall of Fame. The Houston Texans have only twice drafted two or more times in the first round, which occurred in 2004 and 2022.

Key

Player selections 
Houston Texans

first-round draft picks

Footnotes

References

External links 
Houston Texans History